Bryne Stadion is a multi-purpose stadium in Bryne, Norway. It is currently used mostly for football matches, and is the home ground of Bryne FK. 

The record attendance was set in 1980, when 13,621 spectators attended a match against Viking FK. Today, the seated capacity is 2,507, while the total capacity is 4,000.

References

Football venues in Norway
Eliteserien venues
Multi-purpose stadiums in Norway
Bryne FK
Time, Norway